Henriette Huber is a Hungarian sprint canoer who competed in the late 1980s and early 1990s. She won two silver medals in the K-4 500 m event at the ICF Canoe Sprint World Championships, earning them in 1989 and 1990.

References

Hungarian female canoeists
Living people
Year of birth missing (living people)
ICF Canoe Sprint World Championships medalists in kayak
20th-century Hungarian women